King Bu was king of Gija Joseon. The period of his reign was from 232 BC to 220 BC. His posthumous name was King Jong Tong (hangul: 종통왕, hanja: 宗統王).  His personal name was Gibu (hangul: 기부, hanja: 基否). He was succeeded by Jun of Gojoseon.

See also 
 List of Korean monarchs
 History of Korea

References

External links 
 안정복의 《동사강목》(東史綱目)
 이덕무의 《앙엽기》(盎葉記) - 국가지식포털 한국고전번역원 - 기자조선 계보
 이만운의 《기년아람》(紀年兒覽) - 권5 기자조선
 청주 한씨 중앙종친회 기자조선 왕위 계보

Gija Joseon rulers